Chor Chee Heung (born 15 March 1955) is a Malaysian politician and was the Member of Parliament of Malaysia for the Alor Setar constituency in Kedah, Malaysia from 21 October 1990 to 5 May 2013. He was a member of the Malaysian Chinese Association (MCA) in the then-governing Barisan Nasional (BN) coalition and was the Minister for Housing and Local Government.

Chor was elected to the Alor Setar constituency in 1990. He retained the seat in the 2008 election by 184 votes, before being defeated in the 2013 election. In June 2010, he was promoted to Minister of Housing and Local Government. He had previously been a Deputy Minister, and had served in various Parliamentary Secretary and Deputy Minister positions since 1995.

Chor was a MCA Vice President.

Personal life
Chor was born in Alor Setar. Before entering politics, he was a lawyer. He is married with 3 children.

Election results

Honours

Honours of Malaysia
  :
  Commander of the Order of Loyalty to the Crown of Malaysia (PSM) - Tan Sri (2014)

  :
  Knight Companion of the Order of Loyalty to the Royal House of Kedah (DSDK) - Dato' (1998)
  Knight Commander of the Glorious Order of the Crown of Kedah (DGMK) - Dato' Wira (2008)
  Knight Grand Companion of the Order of Loyalty to the Royal House of Kedah (SSDK) - Dato' Seri (2012)
  :
  Knight Commander of the Order of the Crown of Kelantan (DPMK) - Dato' (2003)
  Knight Grand Commander of the Order of the Loyalty to the Crown of Kelantan (SPSK) - Dato' (2009)
  :
  Companion Class I of the Exalted Order of Malacca (DMSM) - Datuk (2002)
  Grand Commander of the Exalted Order of Malacca (DGSM) - Datuk Seri (2011)
  :
  Grand Knight of the Order of Sultan Ahmad Shah of Pahang (SSAP) - Dato' Sri (2011)
  :
  Knight Commander of the Order of the Crown of Perlis (DPMP) - Dato' (2004)

References

 

20th-century Malaysian lawyers
Living people
Malaysian Chinese Association politicians
Malaysian people of Hakka descent
Malaysian politicians of Chinese descent
People from Dabu
People from Alor Setar
1955 births
Malaysian Buddhists
Government ministers of Malaysia
Members of the Dewan Rakyat
Alumni of City, University of London
Commanders of the Order of Loyalty to the Crown of Malaysia
Knights Grand Companion of the Order of Loyalty to the Royal House of Kedah